Batteries Included was Servotron's second release. It is also referred to as Red Robot Refund or Servotron. It was released on gray vinyl and black vinyl in 1996 on Goldenrod. The cover is all gray with raised Servotron lettering. The plastic sleeves with the gray version are screened with the same lettering and a robot walking (pictured). "Red Robot Refund" is about the red robot (R5-D4) in Star Wars Episode IV: A New Hope that Uncle Owen buys but immediately malfunctions. "Batteries Included" is a song about vibrators and how their use will cause the extinction of the human race through lack of reproduction.

Track listing
Blank Side: "Red Robot Refund (Ode to R5-D4)"
Blank Side: "Batteries Included"

Servotron albums
1996 EPs